Theodore Bar Konai was a distinguished Syriac exegete and apologist of the Church of the East who seems to have flourished at the end of the eighth century.  His most famous work was a book of scholia on the Old and New Testaments.

Life and works 
Bar Konai appears to have lived during the reign of Timothy I (780–823), Patriarch of the Church of the East, though some scholars have placed him a century later. Assemani identified him with a bishop named Theodore, the nephew of the patriarch Yohannan IV (900–5), who was appointed to the diocese of Lashom in Beth Garmaï in 893, and his dating was followed by Wright.  Chabot and Baum and Winkler, however, both place him at the end of the eighth century.

Theodore was the author of the Scholion (Kṯāḇā d-ʾeskoliyon), a set of scholia on both the Old and New Testaments (edited between 1908 and 1912 by the celebrated scholar Addai Scher), believed to have been written circa 792.  The Scholia offer an apologetic presentation in nine chapters, similar to a catechism, of East Syrian Christianity, and contain a valuable overview, in a tenth and eleventh chapter, of heretical doctrines and non-Christian religions such as Zoroastrianism, Manichaeism and Islam, with which Theodore sharply disagreed.

Theodore was also the author of an ecclesiastical history, a treatise against Monophysitism, a treatise against the Arianism, a colloquy between a pagan and a Christian, and a treatise on heresies.  His Church History contains some interesting details of the lives of the Patriarchs of the Church of the East. He is the latest author to mention Gilgamesh before his rediscovery in the 19th century. He lists him twice in somewhat garbled forms, as tenth and twelfth in a list of twelve kings who reigned between Peleg and Abraham.

Notes

References
 Assemani, J. S., Bibliotheca Orientalis Clementino-Vaticana (4 vols, Rome, 1719–28)
 Chabot, J. B., 'Syriac Language and Literature', Catholic Encyclopedia (New York, 1912)
 
 Wright, W., A Short History of Syriac Literature (London, 1894)

External links
Liber scholiorum/Ketba Deskolion, edited by Addai Scher, full text online
Theodore bar Koni

Syriac writers
Nestorians in the Abbasid Caliphate
Christian apologists
8th-century Christian clergy
Church of the East writers
8th-century Christian theologians
Biblical commentaries